National Reined Cow Horse Association Hall of Fame was created by the National Reined Cow Horse Association (NRCHA) for the NRCHA Hall of Fame to recognize extraordinary athletes, individuals, riders, and horses in the equestrian sport of Working cow horse. The organization is headquartered in Pilot Point, Texas.

Inductees

Hall of Fame Horses 

Source:

Hall of Fame People 

Source:

Hall of Merit 

Source:

See also
 Campdrafting
 Cutting (sport)
 Horse show
 National Reining Horse Association
 National Reining Horse Association Hall of Fame
 National Reining Horse Association Champions and Awards
 National Reined Cow Horse Association Hall of Fame
 National Reined Cow Horse Association Champions
 Ranch sorting
 Reining
 Stock horse
 Team penning
 Western riding
 Western saddle

References

External links
 Official Site
 National Reined Cow Horse Association (Video)
 What is Reined Cow Horse aka Working Cow Horse (Photos & Video)

Western-style riding
Horse showing and exhibition
Equestrian organizations
Working stock horse sports
Reining
Halls of fame in Illinois
Sports halls of fame
Cowboy halls of fame